Prince Hermann Friedrich Fernando Roland of Leiningen (born April 16, 1963) is a Canadian banker and the younger son of Prince Karl of Leiningen and Princess Maria Luisa of Bulgaria. He is 173rd in line to the British throne as of 2011.

Life 
Leiningen was born in Toronto, Ontario. Through his mother, Leiningen is a grandson of King Boris III of Bulgaria, a great-grandson of King Victor Emmanuel III of Italy and great-great-grandson of King Nicholas of Montenegro. Through his father, he is a great-great-great grandson of both Queen Victoria and Alexander II of Russia.

As a member of a princely family, Leiningen is styled by courtesy (but not officially) His Serene Highness (. Leiningen is a financial analyst and banker, addressed as Mr. Hermann Leiningen professionally. , Leiningen worked for a division of Royal Bank of Canada.

Issue 
On 16 May 1987, Leiningen married Deborah Cully (born December 2, 1961). They have three children:
 Tatiana Victoria Maureen Prinzessin zu Leiningen (born August 27, 1989), presently a graduate of Queen's University, having studied art and graduating in 2012. She also completed a Masters of Management, Innovation and Entrepreneurship at the Smith School of Business at Queen's University in 2018. She married Clayton Reynolds on June 17, 2017. They had a son: August Rhodes Robert Reynolds Leiningen, born on June 14, 2021
 Nadia Christiane Ruth Prinzessin zu Leiningen (born December 16, 1991), presently a graduate of Queen's University, having studied drama. She also completed teachers college and her Masters of Professional Education at Queen's University in 2019. She married Ian Baker on July 18, 2020. They have a son: Thomas James Baker Leiningen, born on December 20, 2021
 Alexandra Sophia Maria Prinzessin zu Leiningen (born December 18, 1997). She is a student at Queen's University studying drama and English. She is known as Alexa.

Ancestry

References

Hermann of Leiningen, Prince
Living people
Leiningen family
People from Toronto
Princes of Leiningen
Valley Forge Military Academy and College alumni